Atlantis is a free open-ended multi-player computer moderated fantasy turn-based strategy game for any number of players. It is played via email. The game world is populated by many races and monsters. Players may attempt to carve out huge empires, become master magicians, intrepid explorers, rich traders or any other career that comes to mind and interact with other players in trade, war and alliances. There is no declared winner of the game, players set their own objectives, and one can join at any time.

Russell Wallace developed the initial version and ran the first game, Atlantis 1.0 in 1993. Geoff Dunbar continued the legacy, first with the extensive playtest of Atlantis 2.0, and then the commercial game Atlantis 3.0. Atlantis 4.0 was created by Geoff Dunbar. AtlantisDev was formed sometime after that and Joseph Traub became the maintainer of the code. Atlantis 4.0 was later expanded on by various contributors from the AtlantisDev group. The current version is 5.1.

Software 
 Atlantis Little Helper open source GUI client
 The Atlantis Crystal Ball another free GUI
 The Atlantis Advisor a full version of The Atlantis Advisor, for free

Running Games 
 Atlantis New Origins. Version 5.2 game with 3 days / week turns.
 Twilight Atlantis (Miskatonic 2). Version 4.2 game with 3 days / week turns.
 Havilah. Version 5.1 game with weekly turns.
 PBEM.za.org. Daily and Weekly Atlantis Games, 4.1 and Conquest rules.
 Arno's Atlantis. Based on Atlantis 4.0.
 Atlas. Modified Atlantis 1.0 test game.

External links 
 The Atlantis Project contains the history of Atlantis 1–3.
 Atlantis 4 and 5 project homepage.
 Atlantis 5 source code. The project's GitHub repository.
 Atlantis 1.0 source code. Enno Rehling's modernized version of the original Atlantis.
 German Atlantis. Based on Alex Schröder's translation from 1995.
 PBM.COM. Greg Lindahl's PbM/PbeM Games Homepage.
 Loria's game rules. Rules of a previous Atlantis 4 game.
 atlantisdev. Development mailing list.
 Atlantis New Origins Game Atlantis v5 game started July 2019.

1993 video games
Fantasy video games
Play-by-email video games
Open-source video games
Strategy video games